A list of films produced by the Tollywood (Bengali language film industry) based in Kolkata in the year 1996.

Highest-grossing
Bhai Amar Bhai

A-Z of films

References

External links
 Tollywood films of 1996 at the Internet Movie Database

1996
Lists of 1996 films by country or language
 Bengali
1996 in Indian cinema